A jinx (also jynx), in popular superstition and folklore, is a curse or the attribute of attracting bad or negative luck.

The word "jynx" meaning the bird wryneck and sometimes a charm or spell has been in use in English since the seventeenth century. The modern spelling and connotations developed late in the nineteenth century. In the 21st-century press, the suggestion a ship might be "jinxed" was made in connection with two cruise liners after misfortunes, MS Queen Victoria and the Emerald Princess. In the 20th century, the Australian aircraft carrier HMAS Melbourne was sometimes said to be jinxed, having twice struck a friendly ship, with considerable loss of life. 

The term "jinx" also arises when one does not want to say something positive about an incomplete or inconclusive situation out of fear of "jinxing it". The superstition goes that speaking positively about one's current situation will cause it to be "jinxed", and things will start to go wrong.

Jinx is also the name given to a game between friends (especially children) when two people say the same word or phrase at the same time and they then call "jinx".

Etymology 
The Online Etymology Dictionary states that "jynx", meaning a charm or spell, was in usage in English as early as the 1690s. The same source states that "jinx", with that specific spelling, is first attested in American English in 1911. Jynx/jinx is traced to the 17th-century word jyng, meaning "a spell", and ultimately to the Latin word iynx, also spelled jynx, as 'j' and 'i' are the same letter in Latin. The Latin iynx came from the Greek name of the wryneck bird, iunx, associated with sorcery; not only was the bird used in the casting of spells and in divination, but the Ancient Romans and Greeks traced the bird's mythological origins to a sorceress named Iynx, who was transformed into this bird to punish her for a spell cast on the god Zeus.

History
A "Mr Jinx" appeared in Ballou's monthly magazine – Volume 6, page 276, in 1857.

Barry Popik of the American Dialect Society suggests that the word should be traced back to an American folksong called Captain Jinks of the Horse Marines written by William Lingard in 1868.

In 1887, the character Jinks Hoodoo, described as "a curse to everybody, including himself" appeared in the musical comedy Little Puck, and the name was quickly picked up by the press.

In sports
One of the uses of the word "jinx" has been in the context of baseball; in the short story The Jinx (1910) – later collected in the book The Jinx: Stories of the Diamond (1911) – Allen Sangree wrote:

By th' bones of Mike Kelly, I'll do it! Yes, sir, I'll hoodoo th' whole darned club, I will. I'll put a jinx on 'em or my name ain't Dasher, an' that goes!

And again

and later referenced in Pitching at a Pinch (1912), Christy Mathewson explained that "a jinx is something which brings bad luck to a ball player." Baseball's most common "jinx" belief is that talking about a pitcher's ongoing no-hitter will cause it to be ended. See also Curse of the Bambino.

See also
Curse (disambiguation)
Hex (disambiguation)
Jinks (disambiguation)

References

Luck
Curses